Yewlashy (Belarusian: Еўлашы́, Jeŭlašy; Russian: Евлаши; Polish: Jewłasze) is a village in Belarus, in the Shchuchyn Raion of Grodno Region.

History 
In the interwar period, the village was situated in Poland, in the Nowogródek Voivodeship, in the Lida County, in the Dziembrow Commune. After the Soviet invasion of Poland in 1939, the village became part of the BSSR. In the years 1941-1944 it was under German occupation. Then the village was again in the BSSR. From 1991 in the Republic of Belarus.

On June 16, 1944, Jan Piwnik "Ponury" died in the fight against the Germans near Yewlashy. His body was buried on June 18 at the cemetery in Wawiorka and only in 1988 brought to Poland. A monument with the inscription "To Polish soldiers and officers who died in the fight against German-fascist invaders during World War II in the Shchuchyn district" was erected next to the forest in Yewlashy, in the hamlet of Bogdany. In June 2022, the plaque with the words was removed by unknown perpetrators.

References

Villages in Belarus